The final tournament of the 2008 UEFA European Under-17 Championship was the 26th UEFA European Under-17 Championship, UEFA's premier football tournament for players under the age of 17. The tournament was held in Turkey from 4 to 16 May 2008. Players born after 1 January 1991 were eligible to participate in this competition.

Qualification
Two rounds of qualifying were held in order to determine the seven teams to join the hosts, Turkey, at the final tournament. The qualifying round, held from 14 September to 28 October 2007, divided the 52 remaining UEFA nations into 13 groups of four. At the end of the qualifying round, the top two teams in each group and the two best third-placed teams qualified for the elite round. The elite round, held from 13 to 31 March 2008, divided the remaining 28 teams into seven groups of four. At the end of the round, the top team in each group advanced to the final tournament.

Qualified teams

Squads

Group stage

Group A

Group B

Knockout stage

Semi-finals

Final

Goalscorers
4 goals
 Yannis Tafer

3 goals
 Thiago
 Sergio García

2 goals
 Geoffrey Castillion
 Danijel Aleksić
 Rubén Rochina
 Keko
 Jorge Pulido

1 goal
 Clément Grenier
 Timothée Kolodziejczak
 Alexandre Lacazette
 William Rémy
 Ricardo van Rhijn
 Conor Hourihane
 Paul Murphy

Awards

Golden Player:  Danijel Aleksić
Best Goalkeeper:  Vilson Caković

References

UEFA.com
RSSSF.com

 
2008
2007–08 in Turkish football
2007–08 in European football
European 2008
2008 UEFA European Under-17 Championship
2008 UEFA European Under-17 Championship
Youth football in Turkey
May 2008 sports events in Europe
2008 in youth association football